Euspondylus caideni is a species of lizard in the family Gymnophthalmidae. The species is endemic to Peru.

Etymology
The specific name, caideni, is in honor of Caiden Christopher Vlasimsky (born 2003), the son of a Texan supporter of BIOPAT – Patrons for Biodiversity.

Geographic range
E. caideni is found in Department of Cuzco, Peru.

Habitat

Reproduction
E. caideni is oviparous.

References

Further reading
Köhler G (2003). "Two new species of Euspondylus (Squamata: Gymnophthalmidae) from Peru". Salamandra 39 (1): 5–20. (Euspodylus caideni, new species, pp. 12–17, Figures 4–6). (in English, with an abstract in German, bilingual figure captions).
Köhler G, Lehr E (2004). "Comments on Euspondylus and Proctoporus (Squamata: Gymnophthalmidae) from Peru, with the description of three new species and a key to the Peruvian species". Herpetologica 60 (4): 501–518.

Euspondylus
Reptiles of Peru
Endemic fauna of Peru
Reptiles described in 2003
Taxa named by Gunther Köhler